Juerg Leuthold is a full professor at ETH Zurich, Switzerland.

Biography 
Leuthold was born in 1966 in Switzerland. He received a Ph.D. degree in physics from ETH Zurich for work in the field of integrated optics and all-optical communications. 

From 1999 to 2004 Leuthold was affiliated with Bell Labs, Lucent Technologies in Holmdel, USA, where he performed device and system research with III/V semiconductor and silicon optical bench materials for applications in high-speed telecommunications. 

From 2004 to 2013 Leuthold was a full professor at Karlsruhe Institute of Technology, where he headed the Institute of Photonics and Quantum Electronics and the Helmholtz Institute of Microtechnology. Since March 2013 he has been a full professor at ETH Zurich, where he heads the Institute of Electromagnetic Fields.

Affiliations 
Leuthold is a fellow of the Optical Society of America and of the Institute of Electrical and Electronics Engineers. When he was a professor at Karlsruhe, he was a member of the Helmholtz Association Think Tank and a member of the Heidelberg Academy of Science. He served on the board of directors of the Optical Society of America. Leuthold has been and is serving the community as general chair and in many technical program committees.

Research Interests
Leuthold interests are in the fields of photonics, terahertz and communications. His current activities are centered around"

 High-speed optical communications and sensing
 Microwave photonics and terahertz technologies
 Plasmonics
 Integrated optics
 Atomic Scale Technologies (Memristive device research)

Research 
 Direct conversion of an RF signal to an optical signal by means of plasmonic-antenna
Plasmonic detection with 100 GHz and beyond bandwidth and high responsivity
The demonstration of the smallest and most compact plasmonic modulators
 Demonstration of single atom plasmonic switches (i.e. switches, where relocating a single atom performs optical switching operation in the order o 10 dB) 
 Record Encoding of 26 Tbit/s of OFDM data onto a single laser  and Nyquist encoding of 30 Tbit/s of data onto a single laser
 Record nonlinear conversion in a short silicon slot waveguide
 First 100 Gbit/s single carrier wireless transmission demonstration
 Development of DPSK Transmission system
 Record all-optical signal processing: Most compact and fast 100 Gbit/s all-optical wavelength converter, and demonstration of 1'000'000 km transmission 
 Theory and demonstration of "most perfect" semiconductor-optical amplifier (SOA) based all-optical signal wavelength conversion scheme
 Contributions to the development of Multimode-Interference (MMI) Couplers: Introduction of higher-order mode converters, spatial mode filters realized by MMIs, or MMI couplers with tunable splitting ratios

Awards and honors
 2018 	Doron Prize
 2015 	ERC Advanced Research Grant
 2013 	Elevated to the rank of a Fellow of the Institute of Electrical and Electronics Engineers for contributions to high-speed optical communications
 2011 	Hector Fellow Research Price
 2010 	Member of the Heidelberg Academy of Sciences
 2009 	 for achievements in silicon nanotechnology. This is the highest funded research prize of a German state and entitles to an extra research fund worth €100,000.
 2009 	Elevation to the rank of Fellow of the Optical Society (OSA)
 2007 	Election to "Top five Innovators in the field of Optics in Germany of the year 2007" by the German VDI
 2002 	Central Bell Labs Teamwork Awards" for the development of the  "RZ-DPSK System"
 1999 	Award of the "1999 Lucent President's Award for Team Excellence" (In recognition of the first fully integrated 100 Gbit/s InP optic chip for data encryption)

External links 

 integrated optics
 Karlsruhe Institute of Technology, 
 List of Publications
 Institute of Electromagnetic Fields.

References 

Academic staff of ETH Zurich
Fellow Members of the IEEE
Fellows of Optica (society)
1966 births
Living people
Optical engineers
20th-century Swiss physicists
21st-century Swiss physicists